Raymond Township may refer to:

Canada 
 Raymond township, in Timiskaming District, Ontario

United States 
 Raymond Township, Monroe County, Arkansas, in Monroe County, Arkansas
 Raymond Township, Champaign County, Illinois
 Raymond Township, Montgomery County, Illinois
 Raymond Township, Rice County, Kansas
 Raymond Township, Stearns County, Minnesota
 Raymond Township, Knox County, Nebraska
 Raymond Township, Cass County, North Dakota, in Cass County, North Dakota

Township name disambiguation pages